Lucas Matías Chávez (born April 3, 1982 in Buenos Aires) is an Argentine volleyball player of Cyprus powerhouse Anorthosis Famagusta and Argentina men's national volleyball team. Chávez is 199 cm and weighs 95 kg.

He started his career with Club Italiano in Argentina and also played with Guaynabo Mets in Puerto Rico (2009–10) and Fenerbahçe Istanbul (2006–07) in Turkey and Hypo Tirol Innsbruck in Austria (2003–04). He was selected European Top Teams Cup Best Scorer in 2004 when he was playing for Innsbruck.

References

External links
 Profile @ FIVB.org
 Profile @ sport195.com

1982 births
Living people
Volleyball players from Buenos Aires
Argentine men's volleyball players
Fenerbahçe volleyballers
Volleyball players at the 2007 Pan American Games
Pan American Games competitors for Argentina